Chena Achena may refer to:

 Chena Achena (1983 film), a 1983 Bengali film directed by Pinaki Chowdhury
 Chena Achena (1999 film), a 1999 Bengali film directed by Subhas Sen